Minacraga itatiaia is a moth in the family Dalceridae. It was described by S.E. Miller in 1994. It is found in southern Brazil. The habitat consists of subtropical wet, subtropical lower montane moist and warm temperate moist forests.

The length of the forewings is 14–15 mm for males and 19 mm for females. The forewings are buff with submarginal shading. The hindwings are buff with brown shading around the anal angle. Adults are on wing in March and April.

Etymology
The species name refers to Pico do Itatiaia, the type locality.

References

Moths described in 1994
Dalceridae